It's Not You, It's Men is an American talk show series starring Tyrese Gibson and Rev Run that premiered on Oprah Winfrey Network on January 23, 2016. The show features conversations with various celebrities focusing on topics related to marriage, sex and relationships. in 2016, Tyrese announced that the show has been officially cancelled.

Episodes

References

External links 
 
 

2010s American television talk shows
2016 American television series debuts
2016 American television series endings
English-language television shows
Oprah Winfrey Network original programming